Kyungon is a village in Danubyu Township, Maubin District, in the Ayeyarwady Region of northern-central Myanmar.

Notes

External links
"Kyungon Map — Satellite Images of Kyungon" Maplandia World Gazetteer

Populated places in Ayeyarwady Region